"O Death", also known as "O, Death", "Oh Death" and "Conversations with Death", is a traditional Appalachian folk song, listed as number 4933 in the Roud Folk Song Index. The song is generally attributed to the musician and Baptist preacher Lloyd Chandler, but it was likely taken or adapted from folk songs already existing in the region.

Variants 
The original version, as performed by Lloyd Chandler and members of the Wallin family:

A modified version with a chorus and different tune, performed by Dock Boggs, Nimrod Workman, Ralph Stanley and others:

Origin 
In 2004, the Journal of Folklore Research asserted that "O, Death" is Lloyd Chandler's song "A Conversation with Death", which Chandler performed in the 1920s while preaching in Appalachia.  Chandler's daughter-in-law, Barbara, asserted that "O, Death" was based on Chandler's composition.
However, Chandler seems to have taken the song from another source or at least based it on an older version.

In 1913, the Journal of American Folklore printed a version sung by "Eastern North Carolina Negroes" 1908:This version seems closer to the version first performed by Dock Boggs than Chandler's "original" version.

Encounters with a personified "Death" featured in traditional English songs which possibly date to the 14th century, including "Death and the Lady" (Roud 1031), which was found in the oral tradition in early twentieth century England. "O Death" bears a strong resemblance to a broadside ballad printed in Ireland in 1870, entitled "A Dialogue Between Death & the Sinner" (pictured).

Recordings
Country blues 1920s banjo player Moran Lee "Dock" Boggs recorded the song in 1963 after his 'rediscovery' during the Folk Music Revival. A recording from the 1938 National Folk Festival in Washington, D.C. by an unknown singer is held by the Library of Congress.  Various folk music artists included "O, Death" on musical collections throughout the 1970s and 1980s. It is sung in the 1976 Barbara Kopple documentary Harlan County, USA by early union activist and coal miner Nimrod Workman, a well known folk music singer from Mingo County, West Virginia. In the 1960s, Alan Lomax recorded the folk and gospel singer Bessie Jones singing "O Death".

Lloyd Chandler's recording of "A Conversation with Death" appears on Rounder Records 1975 release High Atmosphere: Ballads and Banjo Tunes from Virginia and North Carolina, a collection of recordings made by John Cohen.

Among the most famous recordings is Ralph Stanley's version in the 2000 Coen brothers film (and soundtrack album) O Brother, Where Art Thou?, for which Stanley won the Grammy Award for Best Male Country Vocal Performance in 2002. The soundtrack's producer, T-Bone Burnett, originally asked for a banjo rendition emulating Dock Boggs, but Stanley convinced him otherwise with an a cappella performance in the style of the Appalachian Primitive Baptist Universalist church. The song also appears in episode 7 of the second season of television series Fargo, inspired by another Coen brothers film of the same name. The version used in this episode was recorded by Shakey Graves with Monica Martin of PHOX.

"O, Death" has appeared twice in American television series Supernatural, both times in connection with the show's personification of Death, portrayed by Julian Richings: the 2010 episode "Two Minutes to Midnight" featured a version by Jen Titus; Lisa Berry performed the song in character as Billie in the 2015 episode "Form and Void". A version by Amy Van Roekel is included in the 2015 horror video game Until Dawn. The version sung by Vera Hall was featured in episode three of the first season of Altered Carbon, a Netflix original.

Other versions 
A Hill to Die Upon recorded an extreme metal variant with harpist Timbre on Holy Despair (2014).
Amy van Roekel, for the video game Until Dawn (2015).
Bitter End, on Illusions of Dominance (2015).
Camper Van Beethoven, with variant lyrics and melody (1988).
Diamanda Galás, on Guilty Guilty Guilty (2008), All the Way (2017), and At Saint Thomas the Apostle Harlem (2017).
 English folk-rock band False Lights, on Salvor (2015)
Faun Fables, on a reissue of Early Song (2004).
Gangstagrass, on Broken Hearts and Stolen Money (2014).
John Cygan as protagonist Silas Greaves in the video game Call of Juarez: Gunslinger (2013).
Joshua Eustis (formerly of Telefon Tel Aviv), under the moniker "Sons of Magdalene" on Move to Pain (2014).
 John Reedy, on Starday Records, 1961.
Kaleidoscope, on Side Trips (1967).
Kate Mann, in Rattlesnake on the Road (2014).
 American metal band Khemmis recorded a doom metal version on a split EP with Spirit Adrift (2017) and for the video game series The Dark Pictures Anthology.
Mike Seeger with the medieval ensemble Hesperus, on Crossing Over (1988).
Rhiannon Giddens feat. Francesco Turrisi, on They're Calling Me Home (2021).
Rising Appalachia with a spoken word interlude by Theresa Davis, on Wider Circles (2015).
Sam Amidon, on All is Well (2008).
 Americana musician Shakey Graves, on Fargo (2016)
Vera Hall, as Death Have Mercy (1959)

References

External links

American folk songs
Songs about death
Grammy Award for Best Male Country Vocal Performance winners
Death music